Fire Down Below may refer to:

Books 
Fire Down Below (novel), a novel by William Golding and final part of the trilogy To the Ends of the Earth
Fire Down Below, an unwritten science fiction story in Robert Heinlein's Future History

Film and television
Fire Down Below (1957 film), starring Robert Mitchum, Jack Lemmon, and Rita Hayworth
Fire Down Below (1997 film), starring Steven Seagal
"Fire Down Below", an episode of the British television situation comedy Man About the House
"The Fire Down Below", the ninth episode of second season of Hercules: The Legendary Journeys

Music 
"Fire Down Below", a 1957 Top 30 Jeri Southern song
"The Fire Down Below", a song on the Bob Seger & the Silver Bullet Band album Night Moves
"Fire Down Below," a song written by bassist Jerry Scheff for Elvis Presley; the backing track was recorded in 1976, but vocals by Presley or any other backing singers were never overdubbed.
"Fire Down Below", a song by Alkaline Trio on the album Agony & Irony
 "Fire Down Below" a song by Tina Charles on the soundtrack album of the film The Stud.